Aukh Naibdom was the administrative unit of the Caucasian Imamate, and later the Russian Empire. It was one of the naibdoms of the Chechen regions of the Imamate.

History

Caucasian War 
During the Caucasian War, Chechnya was divided by Imam Shamil into special districts, which were called naibdoms, which were part of the vilayets (regions). Each naibdom, which consisted of several auls, with a round number of about 2000 households, was ruled by a naib. The naibs were appointed by Shamil himself and were elected from among the persons represented by the public to the imam. Under the naibs, there were detachments of murids, which were maintained at the expense of the inhabitants of the naibs. Qadis (judges, specialists in Islamic law) and foremen were elected by the people, however, at the suggestion of the naibs, they were approved in their positions by Shamil. The entire male population was divided into dozens, whose members were obliged to observe the behavior of each other and, in case of anything suspicious, they were required to immediately inform the naib of the district if the actions of someone harmed the imamate (country).

As a part of Russian Empire 
Esadze wrote that in 1860 the Terek region was divided into 6 districts: Kabardian, Military-Ossetian, Chechen, Argun, Ichkerin and Kumyk and into two separate districts: Aukh and Salavat, which were temporarily assigned to the Kumyk district (1907). In Esadze's opinion, all these districts (naibdoms), established or transformed during the period of the most vigorous hostilities from 1857 to 1859, were of a temporary nature.

After the end of the Caucasian War, at the place of residence of the Aukhites, for some time there was an administrative unit - the Aukh District. On October 1 , 1862, the Upland District of the Terek Region was formed, which included the Aukh, Salatov and Zandak districts.

Naibs 
 Muhammad from Ingushetia — Ingush Naib who also was the mufti of Ichkeria at one point.
 Tashev-Khadzhi
 Bulat-Mirza, also was naib of Ichkeria. He replaced Tashev-Khadzhi.
 Goïtemir of Aukh — (1844-1847, 1850-1853) 
 Dzhamal
 Miklyk Murtazali from Chirkeï. He was abolished from the office after getting top many complaints
 Idris-Efendi from Endirey (1847-1858), he replaced Miklyk Murtazali from Chirkeï.
 Ullubiï-mulla
 Khoza Mamaev

See also 
 Aukh
 Galashkinskoe Naibstvo

References

Bibliography 
 
 
 
 

History of Chechnya